The Albufera of Gayanes (meaning "lagoon" in Valencian, from Arabic البحيرة al-buhayra, "small sea"), is a freshwater lagoon in the municipality of Gayanes (Alicante), Valencian Community, in eastern Spain.

It is an endorheic basin lagoon whose waters enter the Serpis river. Its existence is documented from the beginning of 15th century. The former lagoon was desiccated to avoid disease during the Spanish Civil War. In 2004, after a few strong rains, the natural space recovered.

In 2007 the lagoon was included in the natural space landscape protected are of the Serpis river. It became a natural protected space supporting a diversity of flora and fauna.

The lagoon is frequented by migratory birds, nidificantes and invernantes. It supports autochthonous turtles. It is surrounded by dryland fields.

Other Albuferes 
 Albufera of Valencia.

See also
Index: Special Protection Areas of Spain

References

External links

 Report about the Gayanes Albufera of the Confederación Hidrográfica del Júcar

Gayanes
Lagoons of Europe
Wetlands of Spain
Protected areas of the Valencian Community
Special Protection Areas of Spain
Geography of the Province of Alicante
Landforms of the Valencian Community